Roger Griffiths (born 6 February 1965) is an English actor who has had several roles in television.

He first rose to prominence opposite Lenny Henry as Gareth Blackstock's foil Everton Stonehead in BBC One 1990s sitcom Chef!. Before starring in Chef, Griffiths played a minor role as a news reporter in the Channel 4 British sitcom Desmond's in 1990. Later in 1990, he appeared in an episode of Birds of a Feather, series two, episode 4 ‘Muesli’ as Daryl's fellow inmate.

Following the run of Chef!, Griffiths played a pirate named Captain Kevin in the BBC educational numeracy television series Numbertime.

Since then, Griffiths has played recurring characters on British soap operas. In 1999 and 2000 he played the role of DS Paul Timpney on police drama The Bill for five episodes. He joined the cast of Holby City in 2006, after a run on EastEnders as DI Riddick and on Family Affairs as Gabriel Drummond. He was a series regular in Vexed (2010–2012) and BBC One's Lenny Henry In Pieces in 2003. In 2010 he appeared in the Only Fools and Horses prequel, Rock ‘n’ Chips as Clayton Cooper. In 2016, he played the part of Newton Farrell in the Death in Paradise episode, “The Blood Red Sea". He rejoined the cast of EastEnders in 2018 as Mitch Baker, the father of Keegan Baker.

Griffiths has also had minor film roles (such as Batman Begins and Buffalo Soldiers), and a minor role in a Doctor Who episode. In 2018 he appeared in series 5 of Still Open All Hours.

References

External links
 

1961 births
Living people
Black British male actors
British people of Barbadian descent
20th-century English male actors
21st-century English male actors
English male film actors
English male soap opera actors